Jabłonna may refer to:
Jabłonna, Łęczyca County in Łódź Voivodeship (central Poland)
Jabłonna, Radomsko County in Łódź Voivodeship (central Poland)
Jabłonna, Lublin Voivodeship (east Poland)
Jabłonna, Świętokrzyskie Voivodeship (south-central Poland)
Jabłonna, Białobrzegi County in Masovian Voivodeship (east-central Poland)
Jabłonna, Legionowo County in Masovian Voivodeship (east-central Poland)
Jabłonna, Radom County in Masovian Voivodeship (east-central Poland)
Jabłonna, Węgrów County in Masovian Voivodeship (east-central Poland)
Jabłonna, Grodzisk Wielkopolski County in Greater Poland Voivodeship (west-central Poland)
Jabłonna, Leszno County in Greater Poland Voivodeship (west-central Poland)
Jabłonna, Turek County in Greater Poland Voivodeship (west-central Poland)
Jabłonna, Pomeranian Voivodeship (north Poland)
 Jabłonna Druga
 Jabłonna Lacka
 Jabłonna Średnia
 Stara Jabłonna